The first USS S. P. Lee (DD-310) was a Clemson-class destroyer in the United States Navy following World War I. She was named for Samuel Phillips Lee.

History
S. P. Lee was laid down on 31 December 1918 by the Bethlehem Shipbuilding Corporation, San Francisco, California; launched by Mrs. Thomas J. Wyche; and commissioned on 30 October 1920.

Assigned to Reserve Destroyer Division, Pacific Fleet, S. P. Lee spent most of her first two years in the San Diego, California area with a reduced complement. She sailed on 6 February 1923 as part of Destroyer Squadron 11 for combined fleet operations in the Panama Canal Zone. Arriving Balboa 20 days later following exercises en route, the destroyer engaged in tactical and strategic maneuvers through the end of March and returned to San Diego on 11 April. She then participated in squadron maneuvers through the end of August with Battleship Division 3, putting in at San Francisco on the 31st.

S. P. Lee sailed for her homeport at 0830, 8 September, in company with most of DesRon 11 under Captain E. H. Watson in  leading the way. Engaged in a high-speed engineering run down the Pacific Coast, the squadron changed course 95° at 2100 as inaccurate navigation indicated it appropriate to make the approach to Santa Barbara Channel. At 2105, Delphy stranded on the rocks of Point Pedernales, known to sailors as Honda, or the Devil's Jaw; though warning signals were sent up by the flagship, the sheltering configuration of the coast line prevented their recognition by the remaining ships of DesRon 11; and, in the ensuing confusion, six other destroyers including S. P. Lee ran aground also in what is known as the Honda Point Disaster.

Valiant efforts by the crew to save the ship proved futile, and the ship was abandoned the following day and declared a total loss. S. P. Lee and her sister destroyers were struck from the Navy list on 20 November. Her wreckage was sold on 19 October 1925 to Robert J. Smith of Oakland, California. He removed some of the destroyer's equipment but was unable to salvage her.

See  for other ships of this name.

References

External links
http://www.navsource.org/archives/05/310.htm

Clemson-class destroyers
Ships built in San Francisco
1919 ships
Shipwrecks of the California coast
Maritime incidents in 1923